Charles Montague Cooke Jr. (December 20, 1874 – October 29, 1948) was an American malacologist who published under the name of C. Montague Cooke or C.M. Cooke.

Life
Charles Montague Cooke Jr. was born in Honololu, Kingdom of Hawai'i on December 20, 1874. 
He was from a wealthy family descended from two early missionaries to Hawaii. His mother was Anna Rice Cooke (1853–1934), a patron of the arts in Honolulu and founder of the Honolulu Museum of Art. His father was Charles Montague Cooke (1849–1909), co-founder of the Bank of Hawaii and benefactor of educational institutions such as Kamehameha Schools, Punahou School, and the Waikiki Aquarium. His grandfather Amos Starr Cooke (1810–1871) founded Castle & Cooke.

Cooke graduated from Punahou School in 1893, and Yale University, with a Bachelor of Arts in 1897 and a Ph.D. in 1901.
He married Eliza Lefferts (1880–1970) from Flatbush, New York on April 25, 1901.
They traveled through Europe before returning to Hawaii.
They built a grand estate in Manoa Valley, the Charles Montague Cooke Jr. House, also known as Kualii, which is on the U.S. National Register of Historic Places listings in Oahu. 
They had two children: Carolene Alexander Cooke (1905–1987) and Charles Montague Cooke III (1907–1952).

Unlike his father and younger brothers such as Clarence Hyde Cooke who became financiers, his interests were in the field of malacology, the study of molluscs.
His cousin Annie Montague Alexander (1867–1950) also became a scientist.
From 1902 he was a curator of the Bernice P. Bishop Museum collection of Pulmonata (snails) in Honolulu. 
In 1905 he bought the extensive collection of shells from early evolution scientist John Thomas Gulick.

Cooke led the museum's Mangarevan Expedition in 1934. He worked with Henry Augustus Pilsbry to identify species of snails in the Hawaiian Islands. He took several expeditions with Kenneth Emory through the South Pacific.

He directed the Cooke Foundation (created by his parents) from 1920 to 1948. 
From November 13, 1909, to April 30, 1914, he was on the board of regents of the University of Hawaii (then known as the College of Hawaii). From February 4, 1911, to July 1, 1913, he was on the Honolulu Parks Commission, and from July 1919 to June 1920 the Fish and Game Commission.

The University of Hawaii granted him an honorary doctorate in 1936.

He died October 29, 1948, and was buried at the Mission Houses Cemetery near Kawaiahaʻo Church.
His assistant Yoshio Kondō became the new curator at the Bishop Museum.

Works
  Ph.D. dissertation
 Alpheus Hyatt and Henry Augustus Pilsbry. 1911. Manual of Conchology. Second series: Pulmonata. Volume 21. Achatinellidae (Amastrinae). Leptachatina by C. Montague Cooke. (The volume was published after Hyatt's death in 1902.) (Amastridae is now considered to be a sole family.)
 1912–1914. Manual of Conchology. Second series: Pulmonata. Volume 22. Achatinellidae by Henry A. Pilsbry assisted by C. Montague Cooke. Genealogy and migrations of the Achatinellidae by Alpheus Hyatt.
 Henry A. Pilsbry & C. Montague Cooke. 1915–1916. Manual of Conchology. Second series: Pulmonata. Volume 23. Appendix to Amastridae. Tornatellinidae. Index, vols. XXI–XXIII.
  H. A. Pilsbry & Cooke C. M. 1918–1920 Manual of Conchology. Second series: Pulmonata. Volume 25. Pupillidae (Gastrocoptinae, Vertigininae). Philadelphia.
  C. M. Cooke & Henry Edward Crampton (1930) "New species of Partula". B. P. Bishop. Mus. Occ. Papers 9: 3–5.

Family tree

References

Further reading

External links
 

American malacologists
People from Honolulu
1874 births
1948 deaths
Punahou School alumni
Scientists from Hawaii